Titidius is a genus of spiders in the family Thomisidae. It was first described in 1895 by Eugène Simon. , it contains 20 species.

Species
Titidius comprises the following species:
Titidius albifrons Mello-Leitão, 1929 – Brazil
Titidius albiscriptus Mello-Leitão, 1941 – Brazil
Titidius caninde Esmerio & Lise, 1996 – Brazil
Titidius curvilineatus Mello-Leitão, 1941 – Brazil
Titidius difficilis Mello-Leitão, 1929 – Brazil
Titidius dubitatus Soares & Soares, 1946 – Brazil
Titidius dubius Mello-Leitão, 1929 – Brazil
Titidius galbanatus (Keyserling, 1880) – Colombia, Brazil
Titidius gurupi Esmerio & Lise, 1996 – Brazil
Titidius haemorrhous Mello-Leitão, 1947 – Brazil
Titidius ignestii Caporiacco, 1947 – Guyana
Titidius longicaudatus Mello-Leitão, 1943 – Brazil
Titidius marmoratus Mello-Leitão, 1929 – Brazil
Titidius multifasciatus Mello-Leitão, 1929 – Brazil
Titidius pauper Mello-Leitão, 1947 – Brazil, Argentina
Titidius quinquenotatus Mello-Leitão, 1929 – Bolivia, Brazil, Suriname
Titidius rubescens Caporiacco, 1947 – Venezuela, Brazil, Guiana, Suriname
Titidius rubrosignatus (Keyserling, 1880) – Brazil
Titidius uncatus Mello-Leitão, 1929 – Brazil
Titidius urucu Esmerio & Lise, 1996 – Brazil

References

Thomisidae
Araneomorphae genera
Spiders of South America